Straw is an agricultural by-product of cereal plants.

Straw may also refer to:

 Straw (colour)
 Drinking straw

Entertainment 
 Straw (band), an English pop band
 "Straw" (story), a short story by Gene Wolfe
 Straw, a board game by Alderac Entertainment Group
 The Straw (play), a 1919 play by Eugene O'Neill
 "The Straw" (The Bronx Is Burning), a television episode

Science 
 Straw (cryogenic storage), a vessel for storing liquids at very low temperatures for long-term preservation
 Barred straw, a moth
 Soda straw or straw, a mineral
 Straw underwing, a moth

People 
 Ezekiel A. Straw (1819–1882), American business manager and politician
 Jack Straw (disambiguation)
 Myles Straw (born 1994), American baseball player
 Syd Straw, American singer
 Thomas Straw (1870–1959), British cricketer

Places 
 Straw, Kentucky
 Straw, County Londonderry, a small village and townland in County Londonderry, Northern Ireland
 Straws, County Tyrone, a townland in County Tyrone, Northern Ireland

See also 
 Straw man (disambiguation)